Andijan (sometimes spelled Andijon or Andizhan in English) ( / ئەندىجان; , Andijân/Andīǰān; , Andižan) is a city in Uzbekistan. It is the administrative, economic, and cultural center of Andijan Region. Andijan is located in the south-eastern edge of the Fergana Valley near Uzbekistan's border with Kyrgyzstan.

Andijan is one of the oldest cities in the Fergana Valley. In some parts of the city, archeologists have found items dating back to the 7th and 8th centuries. Historically, Andijan was an important city on the Silk Road. 

The city is perhaps best known as the birthplace of Babur who, following a series of setbacks, finally succeeded in laying the basis for the Mughal dynasty in the Indian subcontinent and became the first Mughal emperor. Andijan also gained notoriety in 2005 when government forces opened fire on protestors, killing hundreds in what came to be known as the Andijan Massacre.

Andijan was developed into an important industrial city during the Soviet era. Manufactured goods produced in the city include chemicals, domestic appliances, electronics, foodstuffs, furniture, plows, pumps, shoes, spare parts for farming machines, various engineering tools, and wheelchairs.

History

Toponymy 
The origin of the name of the city is uncertain. Arab geographers of the 10th century referred to Andijan as "Andukan," "Andugan," or "Andigan." The traditional explanation links the name of the city to the Turkic tribal names Andi and Adoq/Azoq.

Early and recent history 
Andijan is one of the oldest cities in the Fergana Valley. Marhamat city of Andijan The ruins of Ershi, the capital of the Davan (Parkana) state, with more than 70 cities with a rich and dense population of the V - IV and IV centuries BC. In some parts of the city, archeologists have found items dating back to the 7th and 8th centuries. Historically, Andijan was an important city on the Silk Road.

The city is perhaps best known as the birthplace of Babur who, following a series of setbacks, finally succeeded in laying the basis for the Mughal dynasty in the Indian Subcontinent and became the first Mughal emperor.

After the formation of the Khanate of Kokand in the 18th century, the capital was moved from Andijan to Kokand. In the mid-19th century, the Russian Empire began occupying the area of present-day Central Asia. In 1876, the Russians conquered the Khanate of Kokand and the city of Andijan along with it.

Andijan was the center and flashpoint of the Andijan Uprising of 1898 in which the followers of Sufi leader Madali Ishan attacked the Russian barracks in the city, killing 22 and injuring 16-20 more. In retaliation, 18 of the participants were hanged and 360 exiled.

On 16 December 1902, much of the city was leveled by a severe earthquake which destroyed up to 30,000 homes in the region and killed as many as 4,500 residents. After Soviet rule was established in Andijan in 1917, the city quickly became an important industrial city in the Uzbek SSR.

Modern history
During the Soviet demarcation of Central Asia, Andijan was separated from its historical hinterland as the Ferghana Valley was divided among three separate Soviet republics. Andijan itself became part of the Uzbek SSR.

During World War II, many Soviet citizens were evacuated to Andijan and the surrounding towns. Of the Jewish refugees fleeing Nazi-occupied Poland and banished by the Soviets to Siberia and Central Asia, some relocated to Andijan starting in 1941.

In the 1990s, Andijan and the surrounding region became politically unstable. Poverty and an upsurge in Islamic fundamentalism produced tensions in the region. The town, and the region as a whole, suffered a severe economic decline following the fall of the Soviet Union in 1991. Repeated border closures badly damaged the local economy, worsening the already widespread poverty of Andijan's inhabitants.

May 2005 massacre

On 13 May 2005, Uzbekistan's military opened fire on a mass of people who were protesting against poor living conditions and corrupt government. The estimates of those killed on 13 May range from 187, the official count of the government, to several hundred. A defector from the SNB alleged that 1,500 were killed. The bodies of many of those who died were allegedly hidden in mass graves following the massacre.

The Uzbek government at first stated that the Islamic Movement of Uzbekistan organized the unrest and that the protesters were members of Hizb ut-Tahrir. Critics have argued that the radical Islamist label has been just a pretext for maintaining a repressive regime in the country.

Whether troops fired indiscriminately to prevent a colour revolution or acted legitimately to quell a prison break is also disputed. Another theory is that the dispute was really an inter-clan struggle for state power. The Uzbek government eventually acknowledged that poor economic conditions in the region and popular resentment played a role in the uprising.

Geography
Andijonsoy flows along the city.

Food
Andijan is also known with fascinating dishes, one of the most popular food is Plov also known (Osh) in the local language. Nevertheless, there are some other delicious foods as well such as Somsa, Monti and Dolma in the local language. However, Andijan is also known for its dance called Andijan polka and it has been reported that this dance history goes all the way back to the old centuries.

Climate
Andijan has a cold semi-arid climate (Köppen climate classification BSk) with cold winters and hot summers, rendering a very continental nature, although winters are milder than one might expect for a location in Central Asia. Rainfall is generally light and erratic. Summers are particularly dry.

Demographics
In 2022, Andijan had a population of 458,500. Representatives of many ethnic groups can be found in the city. Uzbeks are the largest ethnic group, followed by Tajiks.

Economy
Andijan has been an important craft and trade center in the Fergana Valley since the 15th century. After annexation by the Russians in 1876, the economy of the city started to grow significantly. Several industrial plants were built in Andijan after the city was connected with Russia with a railway line in 1889. Several hospitals, pharmacies, banks, and printing houses were established in the city during that period. After Soviet rule was established in late December 1917, both light and heavy industries developed significantly. Andijan became the first city in Uzbekistan to be fully supplied with natural gas.

Andijan remains an important industrial city in independent Uzbekistan. There are 48 large industrial plants and about 3,000 small and medium enterprises in the city. Manufactured goods produced in the city include chemicals, domestic appliances, electronics, foodstuffs, furniture, plows, pumps, shoes, spare parts for farming machines, various engineering tools, and wheelchairs. Andijan is also home to over 50 international companies, five of which produce spare parts for GM Uzbekistan.

Education 
There are four higher education institutions in Andijan City. Andijan state university, Andijan medical institute, Andijan machine-building institute and Andijan branch Tashkent state agrarian university. The Andijan Medical Institute is the largest of the four. In 2022, Andijan state institute of foreign languages was founded, being the only state institute where foreign languages are taught. The city is also home to four colleges, one academic lyceum, 21 vocational schools, 47 secondary schools, three music and art schools, nine sports schools, and 86 kindergartens.

Notable people 
 Babur (1483–1530) — an emperor and founder of the Mughal Empire in Medieval India

 Nodira (1792–1842) — a poet and stateswoman

 Choʻlpon (1897–1938) — an influential poet, playwright, novelist, and literary translator

 Abbos Bakirov (1910–1974) — a film actor and director, People's Artist of Uzbekistan (1939)

 Halima Nosirova (1913–2003) — an influential opera singer, People's Artist of Uzbekistan (1937)

 Mukarram Turgʻunboyeva (1913–1978) — dancer, People's Artist of Uzbekistan (1937); generally regarded as the founder of modern Uzbek stage dance

 Fotima Borukhova (1916–2009) — opera singer, People's Artist of Uzbekistan (1950)

 Shahodat Rahimova (1919–1979) — singer and actress, People's Artist of Uzbekistan (1940)

 Muhammad Yusuf (1954–2001) — poet and a member of the Supreme Assembly of Uzbekistan, People's Poet of Uzbekistan (1998)

 Robert Ilatov (born 1971) — Israeli politician and member of the Knesset for Yisrael Beiteinu.
 Ruslan Chagaev (born 1978) — WBA heavyweight boxing champion

References

External links

 The official website of the Andijan Region Administration 
 Information about the city of Andijan on the official website of the Andijan Region Administration 

 
Cities in Uzbekistan
Populated places along the Silk Road
Populated places in Andijan Region
World Heritage Tentative List
Fergana Oblast